Caiçara is a 1950 Brazilian drama film co-directed by Adolfo Celi, Tom Payne, and John Waterhouse. It was nominated for the Grand Prize of the Festival at the 1951 Cannes Film Festival.

Plot
Trapped in an unhappy marriage, Marina (Eliane Lage) finds herself the object of desire for her husband's business partner, Manuel (Carlos Vergueiro). While the two men fight to the death over her, Marina finds love with a passing sailor, Alberto (Mário Sérgio).

Cast
 Eliane Lage as Marina
 Abilio Pereira de Almeida as José Amaro
 Carlos Vergueiro as Manuel
 Mário Sérgio as Alberto
 Maria Joaquina da Rocha as Felicidade
 Adolfo Celi as Genovês
 Vera Sampaio
 Célia Biar
 Renato Consorte
 Luiz Calderaro
 José Mauro de Vasconcelos
 Zilda Barbosa as Diretora do orfanato

Production
It was shot between March and September 1950 in Ilhabela, São Paulo.

References

External links

1950 films
1950 drama films
Brazilian black-and-white films
Brazilian drama films
Films directed by Adolfo Celi
Films directed by Tom Payne
Films shot in São Paulo (state)
1950s Portuguese-language films